The Carlsbad Jaycee Open was a golf tournament on the LPGA Tour in 1962, 1963 and 1967. It was played at the Riverside Country Club in Carlsbad, New Mexico.

Winners
Carlsbad Jaycee Open
1967 Murle Lindstrom

Cavern City Open
1964-66 No tournament
1963 Marilynn Smith

Carlsbad Cavern Open
1962 Mickey Wright

References

Former LPGA Tour events
Golf in New Mexico
Recurring sporting events established in 1962
Recurring events disestablished in 1966
1962 establishments in New Mexico
1967 disestablishments in New Mexico
History of women in New Mexico